Rollins Mountain is a mountain in Lincoln, Maine in northeastern Penobscot County. It is the site of a 60 MW wind farm. It was opposed by some local residents.

References

Mountains of Penobscot County, Maine
Lincoln, Maine
Mountains of Maine